Newark Electronics, sometimes called Newark element14, Newark Corporation, Newark (an Avnet Company) or Newark, is a Chicago-based electronic components distribution company serving North America and parts of Central and South America.  Founded in 1934 as Newark Electric, a small Chicago shop selling radio parts, the company is now a subsidiary of catalog distributor Premier Farnell and is the sixth largest electronics distributor worldwide.

History 
The firm was first established in 1934 as Newark Electric, a small shop in Chicago that sold radio parts. The name Newark pays homage to Newark, New Jersey. The company published its first paper catalog in 1948. Over the course of the next three decades, Newark Electronic's phonebook-sized catalog grew to be a widely recognized hallmark within the electronic components industry, occasionally being likened to “the bible of the industry.”  

In 1968, Newark was acquired by the Premier Industrial Corporation and became the corporation's Electronics Distribution Division. In 1996 the Premier Industrial Corporation was bought by Farnell Electronics which then changed its name to Premier Farnell.

Operations 
Newark element14 markets and distributes electronic components and test equipment for engineers and maintenance professionals throughout the US, Canada and Mexico. Products include connectors, relays, switches, semiconductors, sensors, test equipment and tools from companies including Texas Instruments, 3M, Belden, Freescale and Honeywell, among others. Newark element14 is headquartered in Chicago, but its warehouse, used to serve customers throughout the Americas, is based in Gaffney, South Carolina. The company is one of only two U.S. distributors of the Raspberry Pi microcomputer. In September 2014 the company moved its operations from 4801 N. Ravenswood Ave. to a high-rise in the Chicago Loop at 300 S. Riverside Plaza.

element14 Community

Newark element14 is home to the element14 Community, an online information hub and forum for electrical engineers.

See also 
 Premier Farnell
 Farnell element14
 element14

References

External links 
 Newark.com
 element14 Community
 Newark element14 Manufacturers

Electronic component distributors
Business services companies established in 1934
Companies based in Chicago
Distribution companies of the United States
Industrial supply companies
1934 establishments in Illinois